Under the City (Hungarian: A város alatt) is a 1953 Hungarian film directed by János Herskó.

Cast
   János Bagyinszky as Biczó  
 Ferenc Bessenyei as Géza  
 József Bihari as Holló  
 Elma Bulla  as Váradiné, Géza anyja  
 Lucy Cziráky  
 Sándor Deák  
 Zoltán Gera  
 László György  as Holub  
 János Gálcsiki
 Teri Horváth as Józsa  
 Tivadar Horváth  as Zederspitz  
 László Kemény  as Váradi, Géza apja  
 Ferenc Kállai  as Vadász  
 István Palotai  as Komor  
 Sándor Peti  as Friedmann  
 Imre Pongrácz  as Füge  
 Sándor Pécsi  as Varga  
 Lajos Rajczy as Tömör  
 János Rajz  as Vihar  
 Imre Sinkovits  as Dobsa  
 István Somló  as Forba  
 Sándor Szabó as Zilahi  
 Vera Szemere 
 Endre Szemethy as Deres  
 Ádám Szirtes  as Balogh  
 Mária Sívó  
 Sándor Tompa  as Toronyi  
 Ilus Vay

References

Bibliography 
 Desi Kégl Bognár & Katalin Szentpaly. Hungarians in America: A Biographical Directory of Professionals of Hungarian Origin in the Americas. Afi Publication, 1971.

External links 
 

1953 films
1950s Hungarian-language films
Films directed by János Herskó
Hungarian drama films
1953 drama films